= Maryam Jumaa Faraj =

Emirati short story writer

Maryam Jumaa Faraj (Arabic: مريم جمعة فرج) is an Emirati short story writer.

As of 2008, Faraj had published two volumes of short stories, beginning with Fayruz in 1988 and continuing in 1994 with Ma' (Water). Many of her stories take as their theme the lives and concerns of Indian expatriate workers in the United Arab Emirates. Some of her work has been anthologized in English.
